Habibabad-e Mazdak (also Romanized as Ḩabībābād-e Mazdak; also known as Dārtāk) is a village in Sarrud-e Shomali Rural District, in the Central District of Boyer-Ahmad County, Kohgiluyeh and Boyer-Ahmad Province, Iran. At the 2006 census, its population was 776, in 165 families.

References 

Populated places in Boyer-Ahmad County